Bolosauridae is an extinct family of ankyramorph parareptiles known from the latest Carboniferous (Gzhelian) or earliest Permian (Asselian) to the early Guadalupian epoch (latest Roadian stage) of North America, China, Germany, Russia and France. The bolosaurids were unusual for their time period by being bipedal, the oldest known tetrapods to have been so. Their teeth suggest that they were herbivores. The bolosaurids were a rare group and died out without any known descendants. The following cladogram shows the phylogenetic position of the Bolosauridae, from Johannes Müller, Jin-Ling Li and Robert R. Reisz, 2008.

References

Procolophonomorphs
Permian reptiles
Paleozoic reptiles of Asia
Paleozoic reptiles of Europe
Paleozoic reptiles of North America
Prehistoric reptile families